Last Kiss Goodbye is the second studio solo album by guitarist Brian Tarquin, released in October 1997 with a new label Instinct records. Going in a more modern direction, Tarquin moved towards the more funky street grooves. Instinct sent him to London to record with Ernie McKone, bass player from the UK Acid Jazz band Galliano. This was the break through album for Tarquin, featuring the R&R/Gavin radio hit One Arabian Knight   that charted #4 on the NAC/Smooth Jazz radio charts and the Jeff Beck remake Freeway Jam. The album has become a favorite at Smooth Jazz and still receives a generous amount of airplay today on Pandora Radio and Sirius radio.

Critical reception
Last Kiss Goodbye received favorable reviews as JazzTimes wrote "Tarquin's delivery, though detailed, remains melodic and never ventures into the abstract. Although his acid jazz is a gentler breed of fusion, Tarquin plays with a fleet-fingered, smooth style, which floats across freewheeling pieces…"   and Jazziz magazine wrote "Cosmopolitan flair is reminiscent of guitarist Lee Ritenour, with a tincture of Steely Dan."

Track listing

Personnel
Brian Tarquin – guitars, guitar synthesizer
Arden Hart – keyboard, trumpet 
Jim Carmichael – drums 
Crispen Robinson – percussion
Crispen Taylor – drums
Dan Lipman – saxophone
James Hunt – saxophone
Ernie McKone – bass, programming
Chris Ingram – drum programming
Jacko Peake – flute 
Ernie McKone – Engineer
Michael Sarsfield at Frankford Wayne – Mastering Engineer
Jimmy Cohrssen & Javier Chavez – photography

References

External links
 
 
 
 

1997 albums
Instinct Records albums
Brian Tarquin albums